Entrada is a Spanish or Portuguese word meaning entry and may refer to:

Entrada Sandstone, a geological formation spread across Wyoming, Colorado, New Mexico, Arizona and Utah
Entradas, a town in Castro Verde, Portugal
La Entrada, a town in Honduras
La Entrada al Pacífico, a trade corridor between Mexico and the United States
"Entrada" (Fringe), an episode of the television series Fringe